Palaeospondylus is a fish-like fossil vertebrate. Its fossils are described from the Achanarras slate quarry in Caithness, Scotland.

The skull, which must have consisted of hardened cartilage, exhibits pairs of nasal and auditory capsules, with a gill apparatus below its hinder part, and ambiguous indications of ordinary jaws.

The phylogeny of this fossil has puzzled scientists since its discovery in 1890, and many taxonomies have been suggested. In 2004, researchers proposed that Palaeospondylus was a larval lungfish. Previously, it had been classified as a larval tetrapod, unarmored placoderm, an agnathan, an early stem hagfish, and a chimera. A 2017 study suggested that it was a stem chondrichthyan. 

In 2022, researchers report, based on studies using synchrotron radiation X-ray micro-computed tomography, that the neurocranium of Palaeospondylus was similar to those of the stem-tetrapods Eusthenopteron and Panderichthys, and concluded that Palaeospondylus was between those two phylogenetically.

See also

Orcadian Basin

References

 

Prehistoric vertebrate genera
Devonian animals of Europe
Prehistoric vertebrates of Europe
Fossils of Scotland
Caithness
History of the Scottish Highlands
Devonian genus extinctions